Henry Myers may refer to:
 Henry Myers (navy) (1827–1901), paymaster in the United States Navy and Confederate States Navy
 Henry L. Myers (1862–1943), US Senator from Montana
 Hy Myers (1889–1965), American baseball player
 Henry Myers (shortstop) (1858–1895), American baseball player
 H. Clay Myers Jr. (1927–2004), American politician
 Henry C. Myers (Montana politician) (1836–1929), American mayor of Missoula, Montana
 Henry C. Myers (Mississippi politician) (1847–1917)
 Henry Myers (footballer) (1921–1999), Australian rules footballer
 Harry C. Myers (1882–1938), American actor sometimes known as Henry Myers